The 1927 New Zealand Royal Visit Honours were appointments by George V of New Zealanders to the Royal Victorian Order, to mark the visit of the Duke and Duchess of York to New Zealand that year. They were announced on 27 June 1927.

The recipients of honours are displayed here as they were styled before their new honour.

Royal Victorian Order

Knight Commander (KCVO)
 Sir Robert Heaton Rhodes  – New Zealand minister in attendance.

Commander (CVO)
 James Hislop  – under secretary for Internal Affairs.

Member, fourth class (MVO)
 Captain Edward Patrick Ogilvie Boyle – Royal Scots Fusiliers, military secretary to the Governor-General of New Zealand.
 Frederick James Jones – chairman of the Board of Management, New Zealand Railways.
 William Bernard McIlveney – Commissioner of Police.

In 1984, Members of the Royal Victorian Order, fourth class, were redesignated as Lieutenants of the Royal Victorian Order (LVO).

Member, fifth class (MVO)
 Charles Robert Broberg – superintendent of Police.
 Henry Raumoa Huatahi Balneavis – private secretary to the Minister of Native Affairs.

References

1927 awards
Royal Visit Honours
Monarchy in New Zealand